The Reading Prong is a physiographic subprovince of the New England Uplands section of the New England province of the Appalachian Highlands.  The prong consists of mountains made up of crystalline metamorphic rock.

Location

The Reading Prong stretches from near Reading, Pennsylvania, through the Lehigh Valley in eastern Pennsylvania northern New Jersey and into southern New York. It reaches its northern terminus in Connecticut.  In Pennsylvania, the Reading Prong is referred to as South Mountain while in New Jersey and New York the mountains of the subprovince are referred to as the New York – New Jersey Highlands. Near the Hudson Valley, the term Hudson Highlands is often used. The portion of the prong that enters Connecticut is known as the Housatonic Highlands.

Relation to other divisions of the New England Uplands
There are two subsections of the New England Uplands in addition to the Reading Prong.  A prong of the same rock belt extends from the Hudson Highlands south to New York City along the Hudson River.  This region is often referred to as the Manhattan Prong.  The Staten Island Serpentinite is also a southward extension of the New England Uplands.

Geology
The Reading Prong is part of the Precambrian basement which is discontinuously exposed in the north-central Appalachians. The rocks that make up the prong consist of diverse gneisses.  The New England Province and the Blue Ridge province share many geological similarities, and some experts consider the Reading Prong merely a continuation of the Blue Ridge Mountains, which reach their northern terminus at South Mountain near Harrisburg, Pennsylvania. In the gap between the Blue Ridge and the Reading Province, the two mountainous regions descend into the Appalachian Piedmont.  Together, the Blue Ridge province and the New England province are often referred to as the Crystalline Appalachians.  Rocks of the Reading Prong are characterized by elevated concentrations of uranium, the decay of which produces gaseous radon, a potentially hazardous source of indoor contamination in structures constructed on the prong.

Mountains of the Reading Prong

Housatonic Highlands (north to south)

East Hudson Highlands (north to south)
Sour Mountain
Beacon Mountain
Scofield Ridge
North Sugarloaf
Breakneck Ridge
Bull Hill, aka Mt. Taurus
South Redoubt and North Redoubt
Sugarloaf Hill
White Rock
Canada Hill
Anthony's Nose

West Hudson Highlands (north to south)
Storm King Mountain
Crow's Nest
Popolopen Torne
Bear Mountain
West Mountain
Bald Mountain
Dunderberg Mountain

New Jersey Highlands (north to south)

Pochuck Mountain
Maple Hill
Wawayanda Mountain
Sterling Hill
Hamburg Mountain
Sparta Mountain
Lookout Mountain
Allamuchy Mountain
Hackettstown Mountain
Danville Mountain
Watnong Mountain
High Rock Mountain
Jenny Jump Mountain
Mount Mohepinoke
Baldpate Mountain
County House Mountain
Mount No More
Scotts Mountain
Oxford Mountain
Marble Mountain
Upper Pohatcong Mountain
Pohatcong Mountain
Silver Hill
Musconetcong Mountain

Reading Prong of Pennsylvania (north to south)

Chestnut Hill
Morgan Hill
Hexenkopf Hill
Christines Hill
Pektor Hill
Focht Hill
Kirchberg
Swoveberg
Kohlberg
Lehigh Mountain
Saucon Hill
Applebutter Hill
South Mountain

References

Geology of Pennsylvania
Appalachian Mountains
Geology of New Jersey
Geology of New York (state)